Narciso Clavería y de Palacios (1869–1935) was a Spanish architect, notable as an exponent of the Moorish revival style known as Neo-Mudéjar.  He was the grandson of Narciso Clavería y Zaldúa, a nineteenth-century Governor General of the Philippines from whom he inherited the title of Count of Manila.

Railway architecture
Working for the railway company Compañía de los Ferrocarriles de Madrid a Zaragoza y Alicante (MZA), Clavería designed Toledo railway station, his best-known building.  Clavería incorporated references to Toledo's architectural heritage, which he had spent some time photographing.
The facility features a spacious hall with Moorish revival decoration and a clock-tower.

The smaller station at Algodor, between Toledo and Aranjuez, is also attributed to Clavería.

References

External sources
 arteHistoria: Clavería, Narciso

1869 births
1935 deaths
Nobility from Madrid
Historicist architects
Railway architects
Spanish architects
Counts of Manila